The 1987 Junior Women's Softball World Championship is an international softball competition held in Oklahoma City, United States from July 10–18, 1987. It was the third edition of the tournament.

Final standings

References

Jun
Softball in the United States
Softball in Oklahoma
Sports competitions in Oklahoma City
1987 in sports in Oklahoma